Until 1 January 2007 Lunderskov Municipality was a municipality (Danish, kommune) in Vejle County near the east coast of the Jutland peninsula in southeast Denmark.  The municipality covered an area of 96 km2, and had a total population of 5,478 (2005).  Its last mayor was Hans Peter Andersen, a member of the Venstre (Liberal Party) political party. The main town and the site of its municipal council was the town of Lunderskov, located ca. halfway between the cities of Kolding and Vejen, just south of the Esbjerg Motorway.

 Jordrup Parish
 Lejrskov Parish
 Skanderup Parish

Lunderskov municipality ceased to exist as the result of Kommunalreformen ("The Municipality Reform" of 2007).  It was merged with Christiansfeld, Kolding, and  Vamdrup municipalities to form a new Kolding municipality.  This created a municipality with an area of 640 km2 and a total population of 86,102 (2005).  The new municipality belongs to Region of Southern Denmark.

Notable people 
 Paula Trock (1889–1979 in Lunderskov) a Danish weaver

External links 
 Kolding municipality's official website (Danish only)

References 
 Municipal statistics: NetBorger Kommunefakta, delivered from KMD aka Kommunedata (Municipal Data)
 Municipal mergers and neighbors: Eniro new municipalities map

Former municipalities of Denmark
Kolding Municipality